This is a list of people who have served as Custos Rotulorum of Hertfordshire.

 Sir Henry Parker bef. 1544–1552
 Sir Thomas Parry bef. 1558–1560
 Sir Ralph Sadler bef. 1562 – aft. 1579
 Sir John Brograve c. 1583–1613
 Sir Julius Caesar ? – bef. 1619
 William Cecil, 2nd Earl of Salisbury 1619 – aft. 1636
 Sir John Boteler 1642–1653
Interregnum
For later custodes rotulorum, see Lord Lieutenant of Hertfordshire.

References
Institute of Historical Research - Custodes Rotulorum 1544-1646
Institute of Historical Research - Custodes Rotulorum 1660-1828

Hertfordshire